Henk Stallinga is a Dutch multidisciplinary contemporary artist based in Amsterdam.

Biography 
Henk Stallinga, born 1962, graduated from the Rietveld Academy in Amsterdam in 1993, and established Studio Stallinga the same year. Since 1998, the studio is co-owned by managing partner Annemarie Galani.

Stallinga’s visual language is rooted in De Stijl, Japanese architecture, minimal art and conceptual art. Earlier works of Stallinga challenge the perception of the industrial product, its functionality and meaning.

The ideology behind Stallinga’s works is often based on the awareness of the world around us. This involves concepts like sense of time, sound, and visual perception. Stallinga frequently incorporates parts of mass produced ordinary items, and industrial processes to build his conceptual multimedia installations and sculptures. Presenting every day phenomena are in a different context. Stallinga's recent works combine visual elements with motion and sound.

Public collections (selection) 
 MoMA New York
 Fonds National d'Art Contemporain, Paris
 Stedelijk Museum Amsterdam. 
 van Abbe Museum
Achmea Art Collection
 Amsterdam Museum

Gallery

References

External links

Stallinga.nl
Gallery Gerhard Hofland Amsterdam
Gallery Michael Sturm, Stuttgart, Germany
Gallery Baeckerstrasse4, Vienna, Austria

  Beyond common ideas Henk Stallinga
  The New Berlage Chair

1962 births
Living people
Light artists
People from Tytsjerksteradiel
Dutch sculptors
Dutch male sculptors
Dutch contemporary artists
Dutch installation artists
Minimalist artists
Dutch conceptual artists
Dutch multimedia artists
Mixed-media artists
Artists from Amsterdam